Set theory is the branch of mathematical logic that studies sets, which can be informally described as collections of objects. Although objects of any kind can be collected into a set, set theory, as a branch of mathematics, is mostly concerned with those that are relevant to mathematics as a whole.

The modern study of set theory was initiated by the German mathematicians Richard Dedekind and Georg Cantor in the 1870s. In particular, Georg Cantor is commonly considered the founder of set theory. The non-formalized systems investigated during this early stage go under the name of naive set theory. After the discovery of paradoxes within naive set theory (such as Russell's paradox, Cantor's paradox and the Burali-Forti paradox) various axiomatic systems were proposed in the early twentieth century, of which Zermelo–Fraenkel set theory (with or without the axiom of choice) is still the best-known and most studied.

Set theory is commonly employed as a foundational system for the whole of mathematics, particularly in the form of Zermelo–Fraenkel set theory with the axiom of choice. Besides its foundational role, set theory also provides the framework to develop a mathematical theory of infinity, and has various applications in computer science (such as in the theory of relational algebra), philosophy and formal semantics. Its foundational appeal, together with its paradoxes, its implications for the concept of infinity and its multiple applications, have made set theory an area of major interest for logicians and philosophers of mathematics. Contemporary research into set theory covers a vast array of topics, ranging from the structure of the real number line to the study of the consistency of large cardinals.

History

Mathematical topics typically emerge and evolve through interactions among many researchers. Set theory, however, was founded by a single paper in 1874 by Georg Cantor: "On a Property of the Collection of All Real Algebraic Numbers".

Since the 5th century BC, beginning with Greek mathematician Zeno of Elea in the West and early Indian mathematicians in the East, mathematicians had struggled with the concept of infinity. Especially notable is the work of Bernard Bolzano in the first half of the 19th century. Modern understanding of infinity began in 1870–1874, and was motivated by Cantor's work in real analysis. An 1872 meeting between Cantor and Richard Dedekind influenced Cantor's thinking, and culminated in Cantor's 1874 paper.

Cantor's work initially polarized the mathematicians of his day. While Karl Weierstrass and Dedekind supported Cantor, Leopold Kronecker, now seen as a founder of mathematical constructivism, did not. Cantorian set theory eventually became widespread, due to the utility of Cantorian concepts, such as one-to-one correspondence among sets, his proof that there are more real numbers than integers, and the "infinity of infinities" ("Cantor's paradise") resulting from the power set operation. This utility of set theory led to the article "Mengenlehre", contributed in 1898 by Arthur Schoenflies to Klein's encyclopedia.

The next wave of excitement in set theory came around 1900, when it was discovered that some interpretations of Cantorian set theory gave rise to several contradictions, called antinomies or paradoxes. Bertrand Russell and Ernst Zermelo independently found the simplest and best known paradox, now called Russell's paradox: consider "the set of all sets that are not members of themselves", which leads to a contradiction since it must be a member of itself and not a member of itself. In 1899, Cantor had himself posed the question "What is the cardinal number of the set of all sets?", and obtained a related paradox. Russell used his paradox as a theme in his 1903 review of continental mathematics in his The Principles of Mathematics. Rather than the term set, Russell used the term class, which has subsequently been used more technically.

In 1906, the term set appeared in the book Theory of Sets of Points by husband and wife William Henry Young and Grace Chisholm Young, published by Cambridge University Press.

The momentum of set theory was such that debate on the paradoxes did not lead to its abandonment. The work of Zermelo in 1908 and the work of Abraham Fraenkel and Thoralf Skolem in 1922 resulted in the set of axioms ZFC, which became the most commonly used set of axioms for set theory. The work of analysts, such as that of Henri Lebesgue, demonstrated the great mathematical utility of set theory, which has since become woven into the fabric of modern mathematics. Set theory is commonly used as a foundational system, although in some areas—such as algebraic geometry and algebraic topology—category theory is thought to be a preferred foundation.

Basic concepts and notation

Set theory begins with a fundamental binary relation between an object  and a set . A set is described by listing elements separated by commas, or by a characterizing property of its elements, within braces { }. Since sets are objects, the membership relation can relate sets as well.

A derived binary relation between two sets is the subset relation, also called set inclusion. As implied by this definition, a set is a subset of itself.

Just as arithmetic features binary operations on numbers, set theory features binary operations on sets. The following is a partial list of them:
For example, the Cartesian product of 

Some basic sets of central importance are the set of natural numbers, the set of real numbers and the empty set—the unique set containing no elements. The empty set is also occasionally called the null set, though this name is ambiguous and can lead to several interpretations.

Ontology

A set is pure if all of its members are sets, all members of its members are sets, and so on. For example, the set containing only the empty set is a nonempty pure set. In modern set theory, it is common to restrict attention to the von Neumann universe of pure sets, and many systems of axiomatic set theory are designed to axiomatize the pure sets only. There are many technical advantages to this restriction, and little generality is lost, because essentially all mathematical concepts can be modeled by pure sets. Sets in the von Neumann universe are organized into a cumulative hierarchy, based on how deeply their members, members of members, etc. are nested. Each set in this hierarchy is assigned (by transfinite recursion) an ordinal number , known as its rank. The rank of a pure set  is defined to be the least ordinal that is strictly greater than the rank of any of its elements. For example, the empty set is assigned rank 0, while the set  containing only the empty set is assigned rank 1. The entire von Neumann universe is denoted .

Formalized set theory 
Elementary set theory can be studied informally and intuitively, and so can be taught in primary schools using Venn diagrams. The intuitive approach tacitly assumes that a set may be formed from the class of all objects satisfying any particular defining condition. This assumption gives rise to paradoxes, the simplest and best known of which are Russell's paradox and the Burali-Forti paradox. Axiomatic set theory was originally devised to rid set theory of such paradoxes.

The most widely studied systems of axiomatic set theory imply that all sets form a cumulative hierarchy. Such systems come in two flavors, those whose ontology consists of:
Sets alone. This includes the most common axiomatic set theory, Zermelo–Fraenkel set theory with the axiom of choice (ZFC). Fragments of ZFC include:
 Zermelo set theory, which replaces the axiom schema of replacement with that of separation;
 General set theory, a small fragment of Zermelo set theory sufficient for the Peano axioms and finite sets;
 Kripke–Platek set theory, which omits the axioms of infinity, powerset, and choice, and weakens the axiom schemata of separation and replacement.
Sets and proper classes. These include Von Neumann–Bernays–Gödel set theory, which has the same strength as ZFC for theorems about sets alone, and Morse–Kelley set theory and Tarski–Grothendieck set theory, both of which are stronger than ZFC.
The above systems can be modified to allow urelements, objects that can be members of sets but that are not themselves sets and do not have any members.

The New Foundations systems of NFU (allowing urelements) and NF (lacking them), associate with Willard Van Orman Quine, are not based on a cumulative hierarchy. NF and NFU include a "set of everything", relative to which every set has a complement. In these systems urelements matter, because NF, but not NFU, produces sets for which the axiom of choice does not hold. Despite NF's ontology not reflecting the traditional cumulative hierarchy and violating well-foundedness, Thomas Forster has argued that it does reflect an iterative conception of set.

Systems of constructive set theory, such as CST, CZF, and IZF, embed their set axioms in intuitionistic instead of classical logic. Yet other systems accept classical logic but feature a nonstandard membership relation. These include rough set theory and fuzzy set theory, in which the value of an atomic formula embodying the membership relation is not simply True or False. The Boolean-valued models of ZFC are a related subject.

An enrichment of ZFC called internal set theory was proposed by Edward Nelson in 1977.

Applications
Many mathematical concepts can be defined precisely using only set theoretic concepts. For example, mathematical structures as diverse as graphs, manifolds, rings, vector spaces, and relational algebras can all be defined as sets satisfying various (axiomatic) properties. Equivalence and order relations are ubiquitous in mathematics, and the theory of mathematical relations can be described in set theory.

Set theory is also a promising foundational system for much of mathematics. Since the publication of the first volume of Principia Mathematica, it has been claimed that most (or even all) mathematical theorems can be derived using an aptly designed set of axioms for set theory, augmented with many definitions, using first or second-order logic. For example, properties of the natural and real numbers can be derived within set theory, as each number system can be identified with a set of equivalence classes under a suitable equivalence relation whose field is some infinite set.

Set theory as a foundation for mathematical analysis, topology, abstract algebra, and discrete mathematics is likewise uncontroversial; mathematicians accept (in principle) that theorems in these areas can be derived from the relevant definitions and the axioms of set theory. However, it remains that few full derivations of complex mathematical theorems from set theory have been formally verified, since such formal derivations are often much longer than the natural language proofs mathematicians commonly present. One verification project, Metamath, includes human-written, computer-verified derivations of more than 12,000 theorems starting from ZFC set theory, first-order logic and propositional logic.

Areas of study
Set theory is a major area of research in mathematics, with many interrelated subfields.

Combinatorial set theory

Combinatorial set theory concerns extensions of finite combinatorics to infinite sets. This includes the study of cardinal arithmetic and the study of extensions of Ramsey's theorem such as the Erdős–Rado theorem.

Descriptive set theory

Descriptive set theory is the study of subsets of the real line and, more generally, subsets of Polish spaces. It begins with the study of pointclasses in the Borel hierarchy and extends to the study of more complex hierarchies such as the projective hierarchy and the Wadge hierarchy. Many properties of Borel sets can be established in ZFC, but proving these properties hold for more complicated sets requires additional axioms related to determinacy and large cardinals.

The field of effective descriptive set theory is between set theory and recursion theory. It includes the study of lightface pointclasses, and is closely related to hyperarithmetical theory. In many cases, results of classical descriptive set theory have effective versions; in some cases, new results are obtained by proving the effective version first and then extending ("relativizing") it to make it more broadly applicable.

A recent area of research concerns Borel equivalence relations and more complicated definable equivalence relations. This has important applications to the study of invariants in many fields of mathematics.

Fuzzy set theory

In set theory as Cantor defined and Zermelo and Fraenkel axiomatized, an object is either a member of a set or not. In fuzzy set theory this condition was relaxed by Lotfi A. Zadeh so an object has a degree of membership in a set, a number between 0 and 1. For example, the degree of membership of a person in the set of "tall people" is more flexible than a simple yes or no answer and can be a real number such as 0.75.

Inner model theory

An inner model of Zermelo–Fraenkel set theory (ZF) is a transitive class that includes all the ordinals and satisfies all the axioms of ZF. The canonical example is the constructible universe L developed by Gödel.
One reason that the study of inner models is of interest is that it can be used to prove consistency results. For example, it can be shown that regardless of whether a model V of ZF satisfies the continuum hypothesis or the axiom of choice, the inner model L constructed inside the original model will satisfy both the generalized continuum hypothesis and the axiom of choice. Thus the assumption that ZF is consistent (has at least one model) implies that ZF together with these two principles is consistent.

The study of inner models is common in the study of determinacy and large cardinals, especially when considering axioms such as the axiom of determinacy that contradict the axiom of choice. Even if a fixed model of set theory satisfies the axiom of choice, it is possible for an inner model to fail to satisfy the axiom of choice. For example, the existence of sufficiently large cardinals implies that there is an inner model satisfying the axiom of determinacy (and thus not satisfying the axiom of choice).

Large cardinals

A large cardinal is a cardinal number with an extra property. Many such properties are studied, including inaccessible cardinals, measurable cardinals, and many more. These properties typically imply the cardinal number must be very large, with the existence of a cardinal with the specified property unprovable in Zermelo–Fraenkel set theory.

Determinacy

Determinacy refers to the fact that, under appropriate assumptions, certain two-player games of perfect information are determined from the start in the sense that one player must have a winning strategy. The existence of these strategies has important consequences in descriptive set theory, as the assumption that a broader class of games is determined often implies that a broader class of sets will have a topological property. The axiom of determinacy (AD) is an important object of study; although incompatible with the axiom of choice, AD implies that all subsets of the real line are well behaved (in particular, measurable and with the perfect set property). AD can be used to prove that the Wadge degrees have an elegant structure.

Forcing

Paul Cohen invented the method of forcing while searching for a model of ZFC in which the continuum hypothesis fails, or a model of ZF in which the axiom of choice fails. Forcing adjoins to some given model of set theory additional sets in order to create a larger model with properties determined (i.e. "forced") by the construction and the original model. For example, Cohen's construction adjoins additional subsets of the natural numbers without changing any of the cardinal numbers of the original model. Forcing is also one of two methods for proving relative consistency by finitistic methods, the other method being Boolean-valued models.

Cardinal invariants

A cardinal invariant is a property of the real line measured by a cardinal number. For example, a well-studied invariant is the smallest cardinality of a collection of meagre sets of reals whose union is the entire real line. These are invariants in the sense that any two isomorphic models of set theory must give the same cardinal for each invariant. Many cardinal invariants have been studied, and the relationships between them are often complex and related to axioms of set theory.

Set-theoretic topology

Set-theoretic topology studies questions of general topology that are set-theoretic in nature or that require advanced methods of set theory for their solution. Many of these theorems are independent of ZFC, requiring stronger axioms for their proof. A famous problem is the normal Moore space question, a question in general topology that was the subject of intense research. The answer to the normal Moore space question was eventually proved to be independent of ZFC.

Objections to set theory 
From set theory's inception, some mathematicians have objected to it as a foundation for mathematics, see Controversy over Cantor's theory. The most common objection to set theory, one Kronecker voiced in set theory's earliest years, starts from the constructivist view that mathematics is loosely related to computation. If this view is granted, then the treatment of infinite sets, both in naive and in axiomatic set theory, introduces into mathematics methods and objects that are not computable even in principle. The feasibility of constructivism as a substitute foundation for mathematics was greatly increased by Errett Bishop's influential book Foundations of Constructive Analysis.

A different objection put forth by Henri Poincaré is that defining sets using the axiom schemas of specification and replacement, as well as the axiom of power set, introduces impredicativity, a type of circularity, into the definitions of mathematical objects. The scope of predicatively founded mathematics, while less than that of the commonly accepted Zermelo–Fraenkel theory, is much greater than that of constructive mathematics, to the point that Solomon Feferman has said that "all of scientifically applicable analysis can be developed [using predicative methods]".

Ludwig Wittgenstein condemned set theory philosophically for its connotations of mathematical platonism.  He wrote that "set theory is wrong", since it builds on the "nonsense" of fictitious symbolism, has "pernicious idioms", and that it is nonsensical to talk about "all numbers".  Wittgenstein identified mathematics with algorithmic human deduction; the need for a secure foundation for mathematics seemed, to him, nonsensical.  Moreover, since human effort is necessarily finite, Wittgenstein's philosophy required an ontological commitment to radical constructivism and finitism.  Meta-mathematical statements — which, for Wittgenstein, included any statement quantifying over infinite domains, and thus almost all modern set theory — are not mathematics.  Few modern philosophers have adopted Wittgenstein's views after a spectacular blunder in Remarks on the Foundations of Mathematics: Wittgenstein attempted to refute Gödel's incompleteness theorems after having only read the abstract.  As reviewers Kreisel, Bernays, Dummett, and Goodstein all pointed out, many of his critiques did not apply to the paper in full.  Only recently have philosophers such as Crispin Wright begun to rehabilitate Wittgenstein's arguments.

Category theorists have proposed topos theory as an alternative to traditional axiomatic set theory. Topos theory can interpret various alternatives to that theory, such as constructivism, finite set theory, and computable set theory. Topoi also give a natural setting for forcing and discussions of the independence of choice from ZF, as well as providing the framework for pointless topology and Stone spaces.

An active area of research is the univalent foundations and related to it homotopy type theory. Within homotopy type theory, a set may be regarded as a homotopy 0-type, with universal properties of sets arising from the inductive and recursive properties of higher inductive types. Principles such as the axiom of choice and the law of the excluded middle can be formulated in a manner corresponding to the classical formulation in set theory or perhaps in a spectrum of distinct ways unique to type theory. Some of these principles may be proven to be a consequence of other principles. The variety of formulations of these axiomatic principles allows for a detailed analysis of the formulations required in order to derive various mathematical results.

Set theory in mathematical education 
As set theory gained popularity as a foundation for modern mathematics, there has been support for the idea of introducing the basics of naive set theory early in mathematics education.

In the US in the 1960s, the New Math experiment aimed to teach basic set theory, among other abstract concepts, to primary school students, but was met with much criticism. The math syllabus in European schools followed this trend, and currently includes the subject at different levels in all grades. Venn diagrams are widely employed to explain basic set-theoretic relationships to primary school students (even though John Venn originally devised them as part of a procedure to assess the validity of inferences in term logic).

Set theory is used to introduce students to logical operators (NOT, AND, OR), and semantic or rule description (technically intensional definition) of sets (e.g. "months starting with the letter A"), which may be useful when learning computer programming, since boolean logic is used in various programming languages. Likewise, sets and other collection-like objects, such as multisets and lists, are common datatypes in computer science and programming.

In addition to that, sets are commonly referred to in mathematical teaching when talking about different types of numbers (the sets  of natural numbers,  of integers,  of real numbers, etc.), and when defining a mathematical function as a relation from one set (the domain) to another set (the range).

See also

 Glossary of set theory
 Class (set theory)
 List of set theory topics
 Relational model – borrows from set theory
 Venn diagram

Notes

References

Further reading

External links

 Daniel Cunningham, Set Theory article in the Internet Encyclopedia of Philosophy.
 Jose Ferreiros, "The Early Development of Set Theory" article in the [Stanford Encyclopedia of Philosophy].
 Foreman, Matthew, Akihiro Kanamori, eds. Handbook of Set Theory. 3 vols., 2010. Each chapter surveys some aspect of contemporary research in set theory. Does not cover established elementary set theory, on which see Devlin (1993).
 
 
 Schoenflies, Arthur (1898). Mengenlehre in Klein's encyclopedia.
 
 

 
 S
Formal methods
Georg Cantor